Eliot family may refer to:

 Eliot family (America)
 Eliot family (South England)
Earl of St Germans, subsidiary title Baron Eliot

See also
Elliot, including the name Eliot and a list of people with the name